(Latin: Prusa) is a city in northwestern Turkey and the administrative center of Bursa Province. The fourth-most populous city in Turkey and second-most populous in the Marmara Region, Bursa is one of the industrial centers of the country. Most of Turkey's automotive production takes place in Bursa.

As of 2019, the Metropolitan Province was home to 3,056,120 inhabitants, 2,161,990 of whom lived in the 3 city urban districts (Osmangazi, Yildirim and Nilufer) plus Gursu and Kestel, largely conurbated.

Bursa was the first major and second overall capital of the Ottoman State between 1335 and 1363. Mount Uludağ, known in classical antiquity as the Mysian Olympus or alternatively Bithynian Olympus, towers over the city, and has a well-known ski resort. Bursa has rather orderly urban growth and borders a fertile plain. The mausoleums of the early Ottoman sultans are located in Bursa, and the city's main landmarks include numerous edifices built throughout the Ottoman period. Bursa also has thermal baths, old Ottoman mansions, palaces, and several museums.

The shadow play characters Karagöz and Hacivat are based on historic personalities who lived and died in Bursa in the 14th century.

History 

The earliest known human settlement near Bursa's current location was at Ilıpınar Höyüğü around 5200 BC. It was followed by the ancient Greek city of Cius, which Philip V of Macedon granted to Prusias I, the King of Bithynia, in 202 BC. King Prusias rebuilt the city with the advice of general Hannibal of Carthage, who took refuge with Prusias after losing the war with the Roman Republic and renamed it Prusa (sometimes rendered as Prussa). After 128 years of Bithynian rule, Nicomedes IV, the last King of Bithynia, bequeathed the entire kingdom to the Roman Empire in 74 BC. An early Roman Treasure was found in the vicinity of Bursa in the early 20th century. Composed of a woman's silver toilet articles, it is now in the British Museum.

Under Byzantine rule, the town became a garrison city in 562 AD, where imperial guards were stationed there. Already by the mid-6th century, Bursa was known as a famous silk textile manufacturing centre.

Bursa (from the Greek "Prusa") became the first major capital city of the early Ottoman Empire following its capture from the Byzantines in 1326. As a result, the city witnessed a considerable amount of urban growth such as the building of hospitals, caravanserais and madrasas throughout the 14th century, with the first official Ottoman mint established in the city. After conquering Edirne (Adrianople) in East Thrace, the Ottomans turned it into the new capital city in 1363, but Bursa retained its spiritual and commercial importance in the Ottoman Empire. The Ottoman sultan Bayezid I built the Bayezid Külliyesi (Bayezid I theological complex) in Bursa between 1390 and 1395 and the Ulu Cami (Grand Mosque) between 1396 and 1400. After Bayezid was defeated in the Battle of Ankara by the forces Timur in 1402, the latter's grandson, Muhammad Sultan Mirza, had the city pillaged and burned. Despite this, Bursa remained as the most important administrative and commercial centre in the empire until Mehmed II conquered Constantinople in 1453. The population of Bursa was 45,000 in 1487.

During the Ottoman period, Bursa continued to be the source of most royal silk products. Aside from the local silk production, the city imported raw silk from Iran, and occasionally from China, and was the main production centre for the kaftans, pillows, embroidery and other silk products for the Ottoman palaces until the 17th century. Devshirme system was also implemented in Bursa and its surroundings where it was negotiated between the authorities and locals. For example, during the 1603-4 levy, the villagers of a Christian village called Eğerciler, in Bursa, declared that they were responsible for providing sheep to the capital, and the children of the village were very much needed as shepherds. They asserted that even though they were not obliged to give any children for the army, the officers took some anyway, and that they should be returned. The villagers’ claim that it was in tremendous need of future shepherds was taken seriously by the state, and a decree commanded the return of the children. Bursa was also notable for its numerous hammams (bath) built during the reign of Suleiman such as the Yeni Kaplıca. From 1867 until 1922, Bursa was the capital of Hüdavendigâr vilayet. As it was a significant cultural and trade hub, traders, most of whom were Armenians, became very wealthy. The most influential study of Bursa's silk trade and economic history is the work of Ottomanist Halil İnalcık.

In July 1915, thousands of Greek Orthodox Christians sought refuge into Bursa after having been forced out of their coastal villages by orders of the Young Turk government. This worsened the situation of the native Greeks of Bursa, who had managed to survive through the attacks and boycotts of 1914. A short time late, deportation orders came for Bursa's Armenians. Protestant Armenians were initially spared from deportation, but villagers that tried to resist were massacred. Most of the deportees would perish in what became known as the Armenian Genocide. Subsequently, large numbers of Kurds and Circassians, as well as Syrians form the south, were settled in the homes and towns of the deported Christians, radically altering the demographic composition of the town and region. According to Mustafa Zahit Oner, in the last days of the Greco-Turkish War in 1922, the Greek Army attempted to burn the center of Bursa however they were stopped by the allied commanders and were only able to burn the train station together with Turkish civilians in it. The Cretan artilleryman Vasilios Moustakis describes the event with the following words: "The Infantry had come through and set fire to the station. We saw an English general on horseback, who ordered the fire to be put out, because if Bursa is burned, it would be to the detriment of Greece"Following the foundation of the Republic of Turkey in 1923, Bursa became one of the industrial centres of the country. The economic development of the city was followed by population growth and Bursa became the 4th most populous city in Turkey.

The city has traditionally been a pole of attraction, and was a major centre for refugees from various ethnic backgrounds who immigrated to Anatolia from the Balkans during the loss of the Ottoman territories in Europe between the late 19th and early 20th centuries. The most recent arrival of Balkan Turks took place between the 1940s and 1990s, when the People's Republic of Bulgaria expelled approximately 150,000 Bulgarian Turks to Turkey. About one-third of these 150,000 Bulgarian Turkish refugees eventually settled in Bursa (especially in the Hürriyet neighborhood). With the construction of new industrial zones in the period between 1980 and 2000, many people from the eastern provinces of Turkey came and settled in Bursa.

Geography 
The area covered by Bursa corresponds to 1.41% of Turkey's land area, which makes the city 27th in the country in terms of land area. Bursa stands on the northwestern slopes of Mount Uludağ (known as the Mysian Olympus in classical antiquity), on the banks of the Nilüfer River, in the southern Marmara Region. It is the capital city of Bursa Province, which borders the Sea of Marmara and Yalova to the north; Kocaeli and Sakarya to the northeast; Bilecik to the east; and Kütahya and Balıkesir to the south.

Climate 
Bursa has a Mediterranean climate (Köppen climate classification: Csa) under the Köppen classification, and dry-hot summer subtropical climate (Csa) under the Trewartha classification. The city has hot, dry summers that last from June until September. Winters are cool and damp, also containing the most rainfall. There can be snow on the ground which will last for a week or two. Air pollution is a chronic problem in Bursa.

Economy 

Bursa is the largest production centre of the Turkish automotive industry. Factories of motor vehicle producers like Fiat, Renault and Karsan, as well as automotive parts producers like Bosch, Mako, Valeo, Johnson Controls, Delphi have been active in the city for decades. The textile and food industries are equally strong, with Coca-Cola, Pepsi Cola and other beverage brands, as well as fresh and canned food industries being present in the city's organized industrial zones.

Apart from its large automotive industry, Bursa also produces a substantial amount of dairy products (by Sütaş), processed food (by ), and beverages (by ).

Traditionally, Bursa was famous for being the largest centre of silk trade in the Byzantine and later the Ottoman empires, during the period of the lucrative Silk Road. The city is still a major centre for textiles in Turkey and is home to the Bursa International Textiles and Trade Centre (or ). Bursa was also known for its fertile soil and agricultural activities, which have decreased in the recent decades due to the heavy industrialization of the city.

Bursa is a major centre for tourism. One of the most popular skiing resorts of Turkey is located at Mount Uludağ, just next to the city proper. Bursa's thermal baths have been used for therapeutical purposes since Roman times. Apart from the baths that are operated by hotels, Uludağ University has a physical therapy centre which also makes use of thermal water.

Transportation 

Bursa has a metro (Bursaray), trams and bus system for inner-city public transport, while taxi cabs are also available. The citizens of Bursa also prefer Istanbul's airports such as Istanbul Airport and Sabiha Gökçen International Airport for flights to foreign countries, due to Istanbul's proximity to Bursa. There are numerous daily bus and ferry services between the two cities.

The only railway station in Bursa is the Harmancık station on the Balıkesir-Kütahya railway, which was opened in 1930.

The average amount of time people spend commuting with public transit in Bursa, for example to and from work, on a weekday is 62 min. 12% of public transit riders ride for more than 2 hours every day. The average amount of time people wait at a stop or station for public transit is 18 min, while 31% of riders wait for over 20 minutes on average every day.

Education 

Bursa has two public universities and one private university. Uludağ University, founded in 1975 in Görükle, is the oldest institution of higher education in the city. Founded first as the Bursa University then renamed Uludağ University in 1982, the university has a student body of 47,000, one of the largest in Turkey. Bursa Technical University is the second public university of Bursa and was established in 2010, beginning education in the 2011–2012 academic year.

The first private university of Bursa was the Bursa Orhangazi University, which started education in the 2012–2013 academic year. However, Orhangazi University was shut down by the Turkish government after the failed coup attempt of July 2016.

Istanbul Commerce University has opened graduate programs in Bursa in 2013.

The vocational high schools, Bursa Sports High School, and Bursa Agriculture Vocational High School, are located in Osmangazi district.

Sports 

The city has one professional football club, Bursaspor, which formerly competed in the Süper Lig (Super League), the top-tier of Turkish football, until finishing 16th at the end of the 2018–19 Süper Lig season and being relegated to the TFF First League. A few years earlier, Bursaspor had managed to become the Turkish champions at the end of the 2009–10 Süper Lig season, thereby becoming the second Anatolian club to ever win the Süper Lig championship title after Trabzonspor. Henceforth, Bursaspor was often considered to be one of the five biggest football clubs in Turkey, along with Galatasaray, Fenerbahçe, Beşiktaş and Trabzonspor. The club's relegation to the TFF First League at the end of the 2018–19 season was a major shock for its fans and became a first in the history of Turkish football: Never before a club which had won the Süper Lig championship title was relegated.

Bursaspor plays its home games at the Timsah Arena (meaning "Crocodile Arena", crocodile being the mascot of the team), which has a seating capacity of 45,000.

The city has a professional basketball team in the Turkish Basketball League, Tofaş S.K., which is among the most successful teams. The club plays its games at the Tofaş Nilüfer Sports Hall.

Politics 

The current Mayor of the Bursa Metropolitan Municipality is Alinur Aktaş from the Justice and Development Party (AKP), in office since 2019, the AKP coalition won 49.6% of the vote against the CHP coalition which got 47% of the vote.

Main sights

Ulu Cami (Grand Mosque)

Ulu Cami is the largest mosque in Bursa and a landmark of early Ottoman architecture, which incorporated many elements from Seljuk architecture.  

Ordered by Sultan Bayezid I, the mosque was designed and built by architect Ali Neccar in 1396–1400. It is a large and rectangular building, with a total of twenty domes that are arranged in four rows of five, and are supported by 12 columns. Supposedly the twenty domes were built instead of the twenty separate mosques which Sultan Bayezid I had promised for winning the Battle of Nicopolis in 1396. The mosque has two minarets.

Inside the mosque there are 192 monumental wall inscriptions written by the famous calligraphers of that period. There is also a fountain (şadırvan) where worshipers can perform ritual ablutions before prayer; the dome over the şadırvan is capped by a skylight which creates a soft, serene light below; thus playing an important role in the illumination of the large building.

The horizontally spacious and dimly lit interior is designed to feel peaceful and contemplative. The subdivisions of space formed by multiple domes and pillars create a sense of privacy and even intimacy. This atmosphere contrasts with the later Ottoman mosques (see for example the works of Suleiman the Magnificent's chief architect Mimar Sinan.) The mosques that were built after the conquest of Constantinople (Istanbul) by the Ottoman Turks in 1453, and influenced by the design of the 6th century Byzantine basilica of Hagia Sophia, had increasingly elevated and large central domes, which create a vertical emphasis that is intended to be more overwhelming; in order to convey the divine power of Allah, the majesty of the Ottoman Sultan, and the governmental authority of the Ottoman State.

Places of interest 
A brief list of the places of interest in and around Bursa is presented below. For a longer list, see the places of interest in Bursa.

Mosques and külliye complexes 

 Bursa Grand Mosque and 
 Yeşil Mosque and 
 Bayezid I Mosque and 
 Muradiye Mosque and 
 Emir Sultan Mosque and 
 Orhan Gazi Mosque and 
 Hüdavendigar Mosque and 
 Koca Sinan Paşa Mosque and 
 İshak Paşa Mosque and 
 Karacabey Grand Mosque
 Karabaş-i Veli Cultural Centre
 Somuncu Baba Mosque
 Üftade Tekkesi Mosque and complex
 Babasultan Mosque and complex

Bazaars and caravanserais 
 Yıldırım Bazaar (bedesten)
 Koza Han
 Pirinç Han
 İpek Han

Other historic monuments 
 Bursa Castle
 Irgandı Bridge
 İnkaya Sycamore, very big and impressive 600-year-old tree (Platanus orientalis)

Museums 
 Bursa Archaeological Museum
 Bursa Atatürk Museum,
 Bursa City Museum,
 Bursa Energy Museum
 Bursa Forestry Museum
 Bursa Karagöz Museum
 Bursa Museum of Turkish and Islamic Art
 Bursa Turkish Architecture Museum
 İznik Museum
 Mudanya Armistice House
 Museum of Ottoman House
 Tofaş Museum of Cars and Anatolian Carriages

Parks and gardens 
 Uludağ National Park
 Bursa Zoo and Botanical Garden
 Bursa Hüdavendigar Kent Park

Hot springs and thermal baths 
 Keramet hot spring
 Çekirge hot spring
 Armutlu hot spring
 Oylat hot spring
 Gemlik hot spring
 Çelik Palas thermal bath

Beaches 
 Armutlu beach
 Kumla beach
 Kurşunlu beach
 Orhangazi beach
 Mudanya beach

Gallery

Twin towns – sister cities 

Bursa is twinned with:

 Darmstadt, Germany (1971)
 Sarajevo, Bosnia and Herzegovina (1972)
 Oulu, Finland (1978)
 Kairouan, Tunisia (1987)
 Anshan, China (1991)
 Bitola, North Macedonia (1996)
 Ceadîr-Lunga, Moldova (1997)
 Kyzylorda, Kazakhstan (1997)
 Mascara, Algeria (1998)
 Kulmbach, Germany (1998)
 Pleven, Bulgaria (1998)
 Plovdiv, Bulgaria (1998)
 Tirana, Albania (1998)
 Košice, Slovakia (2000)
 Vinnytsia, Ukraine (2004)
 Pristina, Kosovo (2010)
 Bakhchysarai, Ukraine (2010)
 Momchilgrad, Bulgaria (2010)
 Mogilev, Belarus (2013)
 Hebron, Palestine (2014)
 Herzliya, Israel (2014)
 Veliko Tarnovo, Bulgaria (2017)
 Galkayo, Somalia (2018)

See also 

 1855 Bursa earthquake
 Complex of Mehmed I
 Emirsultan Mosque
 Grand Mosque of Bursa
 Green Tomb and Mosque
 List of people from Bursa
 List of World Heritage Sites in Turkey
 Siege of Bursa

References

Further reading

External links 

 Bursa Metropolitan Municipality
 Bursa Governorship

 
Ancient Greek archaeological sites in Turkey
Greek colonies in Anatolia
Bithynian colonies
Cities in Turkey
Populated places along the Silk Road
Populated places in Bursa Province